Accademia Daniel is an Israeli music ensemble that specializes in performing music of the baroque era. The ensemble performs regularly both in their native country and in Europe, appearing at such places as the Tel Aviv Museum of Art, the Haydn Festival in Eisenstadt, and the Bach Museum in Leipzig to name just a few. The ensemble has also performed in concert with several notable musicians and ensembles including the Prague Symphony Orchestra, Simon Standage, Guy de Mey, Barbara Schlick, Michael Schneider, John Toll, Rainer Zipperling, Carolyn Watkinson, and the Oslo Baroque Soloists among others. The Accademia Daniel has also produced several commercial recordings on the Classic Produktion Osnabrück record label.

Sources
Bio at bach-cantatas.com

Early music groups